The term Sanpitsu (三筆) or "three brushes" is used in Japanese to refer to a group of three famous Heian period calligraphers:

Emperor Saga 嵯峨天皇, 786–842.
Kūkai 空海, 774–835.
Tachibana no Hayanari, 橘逸勢 c. 782-842.

Later groups of calligraphers were named in imitation of the original Sanpitsu.

Kan'ei Sanpitsu (寛永三筆)

Named for the Kan'ei period in which they flourished:

Honami Kōetsu 本阿弥光悦, 1558-1637
Konoe Nobutada 近衛信尹, 1565-1614
Shōkadō Shōjō 松花堂昭乗, 1584-1639

Ōbaku no Sanpitsu (黄檗三筆)

Zen Chinese calligraphers who worked in Japan.
 Ingen Ryūki, 隱元隆琦 1592-1673
 Mokuan Shōtō,木庵性瑫 1611-1684
 Sokuhi Nyoitsu, 即非如一 1616-1671

Bakumatsu no Sanpitsu (幕末の三筆)
 Ichikawa Beian (市河米庵) 1779-1858
 Nukina Sūō (貫名菘翁) 1778-1863
 Maki Ryōko (巻菱湖) 1777-1843

Meiji no Sanpitsu (明治の三筆)
Nakabayashi Gochiku (中林梧竹) 1827-1913
Kusakabe Meikaku (日下部鳴鶴) 1838-1922
Iwaya Ichiroku (巌谷一六) 1834-1905

Shōwa no Sanpitsu (昭和の三筆)
Hibino Gohō (日比野五鳳) 1901-1985
Teshima Yūkei (手島右卿) 1901-1987
Nishikawa Yasushi (西川寧) 1902-1989

See also
 Sanseki, a similar group of renowned calligraphers

References
神田喜一郎,「三筆について」(書道全集 第11巻)(Heibonsha, 1965)

Japanese calligraphers
Trios
Japanese culture-related lists